Gavello is a comune (municipality) in the Province of Rovigo in the Italian region Veneto, located about  southwest of Venice and about  southeast of Rovigo.

The municipality of Gavello contains the frazioni (subdivisions, mainly villages and hamlets) Chiavica Pignatta, Magnolina, and Veneziano.

Gavello borders the following municipalities: Adria, Ceregnano, Crespino, Villanova Marchesana.

Demographic evolution

References

Cities and towns in Veneto